Elections were held in Eastern Visayas for seats in the House of Representatives of the Philippines on May 13, 2013.

Summary

Biliran
Rogelio Espina is the incumbent.

Eastern Samar
Ben Evardone is the incumbent.

Leyte

1st District
Incumbent Ferdinand Martin Romualdez  is running unopposed.

2nd District
Sergio Apostol is the incumbent.

3rd District
Andres Salvacion is the incumbent.

4th District
Lucy Torres-Gomez is the incumbent.

5th District
Jose Carlos Cari is the incumbent.

Northern Samar

1st District
Raul Daza is the incumbent.

2nd District
Emil Ong is the incumbent.

Samar

1st District
Mel Senen Sarmiento is the incumbent.

2nd District
Milagrosa Tan is the incumbent.

Southern Leyte
Incumbent Roger Mercado is term limited and is running for the governorship. Incumbent governor Damian Mercado is his party's nominee.

References

2013 Philippine general election
Lower house elections in Eastern Visayas